The Kenneth S. Warren Institute is a not-for-profit organization based in Durham, North Carolina. It is named after Kenneth Warren (June 11, 1929 – September 18, 1996), a powerful figure in twentieth century medicine whose work transformed public health policy and tropical medicine, and who left a profound legacy in global health thinking. The Institute was incorporated as a not-for-profit foundation, under the New York State Not-for-Profit laws and Internal Revenue Code [Section 501 (c)(3)], and was originally chartered in 1980, under the name of The Drug and Vaccine Development Corporation (DVDC).  In response to a U.S. government mandate on the industrial sector to contribute more directly to improving public health in emerging nations, the DVDC espoused to pay particular attention to health problems affecting populations in the developing world. It sought to promote work in the fields of parasitology and tropical medicine.

In 2001, the institute bought a  campus located in Westchester County, New York, from the Kitchawan Institute (also known as the Weston Charitable Foundation).  The campus and surrounding nature preserve was the Kitchawan Research Station of the Brooklyn Botanic Garden. The director and lead researcher was Anthony Cerami. Funding from the Burroughs Wellcome Fund for malaria research was granted to scholars at the institute. Collaborative work was also done with the Neuroscience Institute in Milan (previously part of the Italian National Research Council). Researchers at the Warren Institute looked at erythropoietin as a tissue-protective cytokine in brain injury and eventually developed non-erythropoietic small peptides for innate protection and repair of tissues from inflammation. 

The institute moved from Westchester to the Research Triangle (Raleigh-Durham-Cary in N Carolina) in 2014.

References 

Non-profit organizations based in the United States